Ryczka  is a village in the administrative district of Gmina Uścimów, within Lubartów County, Lublin Voivodeship, in eastern Poland.

References

Ryczka